Joseph Roland Lionel Matte (March 15, 1908 — May 18, 1988) was a Canada professional ice hockey player who played 24 games in the National Hockey League for the Chicago Black Hawks and Detroit Cougars. He played 12 games for the Cougars in the 1929–30 season, and a further 12 with the Black Hawks in the 1942–43 season. The rest of Matte's playing career, which lasted from 1929 to 1943, was primarily spent in the International Hockey League and American Hockey Association. He was born in Bourget, Ontario.

Career statistics

Regular season and playoffs

External links
 

1908 births
1988 deaths
Canadian ice hockey defencemen
Chicago Blackhawks players
Cleveland Barons (1937–1973) players
Cleveland Falcons players
Cleveland Indians (IHL) players
Detroit Cougars players
Detroit Olympics (IHL) players
Franco-Ontarian people
Ice hockey people from Ontario
Kansas City Americans players
People from Clarence-Rockland
Pittsburgh Yellow Jackets (IHL) players
St. Louis Flyers (AHA) players